Grace Episcopal Church is a historic Episcopal church building is located at 210 C Avenue, South, in Minnewaukan, Benson County, North Dakota.

History
Designed in the Gothic Revival style of architecture by Fargo architects Hancock Brothers, it was built by local artisan  Otis Kolstad in 1903 of local fieldstone with concrete mortar and wooden gables and roof. It features a stone bell tower over the side entrance. In 1935 the building was sold to Union Gospel Tabernacle, an Assemblies of God congregation which shared it with St. Peter Lutheran Church. In 1965 it was sold to Evergreen Masonic Lodge No. 46, A.F. and A.M., which did extensive renovations, including superimposing the  Masonic square and compass emblem over the circular stained glass window.

In 1983 the North Dakota Masonic Foundation deeded the property to Minnewaukan Historical Society, Inc., which has restored it and removed some of the changes made by the Masonic Lodge. On September 9, 1994, it was added to the National Register of Historic Places. Today it is called the Stone Church Museum and is still owned by the Historical Society.

References

Churches on the National Register of Historic Places in North Dakota
Episcopal church buildings in North Dakota
Assemblies of God churches
Former Lutheran churches in North Dakota
Masonic buildings in North Dakota
Gothic Revival church buildings in North Dakota
Stone churches in North Dakota
Churches completed in 1903
National Register of Historic Places in Benson County, North Dakota
Historical societies in North Dakota
1903 establishments in North Dakota